Tharwat el-Kherbawy is an Egyptian lawyer and dissident former leader of the Muslim Brotherhood who is known for his anti-Brotherhood views, and present-day political thinker, and researcher on Islamist groups.

He left the Brotherhood in 2002, critical of its use of Islam to justify its political activism.

Books 
Among his well-known writings are:
 Qalb al-Ikhwan: Mahakem Tafteesh al-Jama'a.

Lo MbAye states that Al-Kherbawy's book Qalb al-Ikhwan (The Heart of the Brotherhood or Inside the Brotherhood) "unveils the mysterious inner workings of the organization, how decisions are made and how ideological discipline is enforced through strict adherence to the chains of command", and praises the book's "clear and poignant prose".

 Sir al-Ma'bad: al-Asrar al-Khafiyya li-Jama'at al-Ikhwan al-Muslimin. This book won Best Political Book at the Cairo International Book Fair.

See also 
 Mohammed Habib
 Ahmad Karima

References

External links 
 Interview with Tharwat El-Kherbawy; an insider’s look at the Muslim Brotherhood — Daily News Egypt

Dissidents of the Muslim Brotherhood
20th-century Egyptian lawyers
Egyptian Sunni Muslims
Muslim reformers
People from Sharqia Governorate
1957 births
Living people